John James Doherty (born 22 July 1961) is a former long-distance runner who ran distances from 3000 metres to 10,000 metres. He represented Ireland at the Summer Olympics in 1988 and 1992. He also ran twice for Northern Ireland at the IAAF World Cross Country Championships. His best achievement was a silver medal in the 5000 metres behind Saïd Aouita at the 1989 IAAF World Cup.

Born in Leeds, Doherty competed for England initially before taking up eligibility to represent Northern Ireland and later Ireland through his parents. He won the 1980 AAA Junior title over 3000 metres before taking his first senior national title a year later at the Northern Irish Cross Country Championships.

He attended Providence College on a track scholarship and competed extensively on the American road circuit while there, winning in excess of 35 road races including the 1986 Peachtree Road Race. He also had runner-up finishes at the Azalea Trail Run (twice), Fukuoka International Cross Country (twice), the Bay to Breakers and the Manchester Road Race. He retired from professional running after 1994.

Personal bests
3000 metres – 7:41.59 min (1989)
5000 metres – 13:14.17 min (1990)
10,000 metres – 27:49.74 min (1989)
10K run – 27:56 min (1986)

All information from All-Athletics profile

International competitions

European Cup 5000m Gold
1989

Circuit wins
DN Galan 5000 m: 1988
Peachtree Road Race: 1986
America's Ekiden: 1988 1989
World games Helsinki 5000m 13:15 world best.

References

External links



Living people
1961 births
Sportspeople from Leeds
Irish male long-distance runners
English male long-distance runners
Male long-distance runners from Northern Ireland
Olympic athletes of Ireland
Athletes (track and field) at the 1988 Summer Olympics
Athletes (track and field) at the 1992 Summer Olympics
Providence College alumni